Hoge may refer to:

People

Surname 
 Dean Hoge (1937–2008), American sociologist
 Enos D. Hoge (1831-1916), American judge, lawyer, and territorial legislator
 James F. Hoge, Jr. (born 1935), American foreign Policy expert
 Jane Currie Blaikie Hoge (1811–1890), American civil rights activist
 John Hoge, (1760–1824) American politician from Pennsylvania
 John B. Hoge (1825–1896), American politician from West Virginia
 Joseph P. Hoge (1810–1891), American politician
 Matthew Ryan Hoge (born 1974), American writer
 Merril Hoge (born 1965), American football player 
 Solomon L. Hoge (1836–1909), American politician
 Tristen Hoge (born 1997), American football player
 Warren Hoge (born 1941), American journalist
 Will Hoge (born 1972), American musician
 William Hoge (disambiguation)

Nickname
Hoge Workman (1899–1972), American baseball player

Other uses 
 Hoge, Kansas, United States
 Hoge Building, in Seattle Washington, United States
 Hover out of ground effect, ability for an aircraft to stand still in the air
 hoge, a metasyntactic variable (placeholder in computer science) commonly used in Japan (Japanese version of foo)
 Hoge Finance, a deflationary cryptocurrency launched in 2021.